LaToya Morgan is an American writer and producer. She held two multi-year deals with AMC and was a writer for Parenthood, Shameless, and Complications, and both writer and co-executive producer for Into the Badlands and Turn: Washington's Spies. She signed an overall deal with Warner Bros. Television Group in 2020.

Career

Television 
Morgan began her screenwriting career as a participant in a Warner Bros. Television Group writer's workshop. Her first screenwriting job was for Showtime's Shameless. She went on to write for Complications, Parenthood, and Turn: Washington's Spies.

Morgan signed her first of two overall deals with AMC in 2016, the last of which expired in 2020. She had multiple requests from other employers before signing with AMC. She was a co-producer for an adaptation of The Age of Miracles produced by AMC Studios for HBO Max.  She was also a writer and co-executive producer for Into the Badlands and wrote for The Walking Dead. She collaborated with J.J. Abrams to develop a crime drama, Duster, that HBO Max ordered in 2020.

She oversaw AMC's inclusion initiative designed to create pathways for "diverse" emerging writers. Through the initiative she developed two projects, Farmhand and Of Two Minds.

In July 2020 signed an overall deal with Warner Brothers Television Group, said to be in the seven figures, through her production company TinkerToys Productions. That year, Morgan and Sue-Ellen Chitunya won the Telling Our Stories short film competition hosted by WrapWomen and Starz for their film Team Marilyn.

Morgan will write the screenplay for the upcoming Night of the Living Dead reboot film, to be directed by Nikyatu Jusu.

Other work 
In April 2019 she created the #WGAStaffingBoost to help connect WGA writers seeking work amid the union's dispute with the Association of Talent Agents (ATA).

Morgan's debut graphic novel, Dark Blood, is scheduled for release in fall 2021 by Boom! Studios.

Personal life 
Morgan was born and raised in Los Angeles, California, where she currently resides. She received her MFA in screenwriting form American Film Institute Conservatory in 2005.

Accolades 
 2016 – Nominee, NAACP Image Award, Outstanding Writing in a Drama Series (for Turn: Washington's Spies)
2017 – Nominee, NAACP Image Award, Outstanding Writing in a Drama Series (for Turn: Washington's Spies)

Filmography

References

External links 
 
LaToya Morgan on Twitter

Year of birth missing (living people)
Living people
American women screenwriters
American women film producers
African-American television producers
African-American screenwriters
21st-century African-American women
21st-century African-American people
African-American women writers
American graphic novelists
AFI Conservatory alumni
Writers from Los Angeles
African-American novelists